San Cristóbal is a municipality and city which since 2011 has been included in Artemisa Province of Cuba. It was previously part of Pinar del Río Province.

Demographics
In 2004, the municipality of San Cristóbal had a population of 70,830.

See also
Municipalities of Cuba
List of cities in Cuba
San Cristóbal Municipal Museum

References

External links

Populated places in Artemisa Province